Klapwijk is a Dutch surname. Notable people with the surname include:

Jacob Klapwijk (1933–2021), Dutch philosopher and professor
Philip Klapwijk (born 1962), economist
Truus Klapwijk (1904–1991), Dutch diver and swimmer

Dutch-language surnames